Matt Wanat (born September 16, 1975) is a professional Strongman competitor from Wauwatosa, Wisconsin.

Strongman
After playing football as a walk on at University of Iowa his freshman year, Matt concentrated on his Chemical Engineering degree. He began competing in Strongman in 2003 in New London Wisconsin taking second place to Sam McMahon at his first contest. He also competed at Amateur Nationals that year against other (now Pro's) Sam McMahon; Dave Ostlund; Travis Ortmeyer; and Van Hatfield.  After competing twice, taking a 2nd and 1st in 2005 contests, Matt earned his Pro card in June 2005 at the Strongest Man on Grand contest in St. Paul, Minnesota. He took first in the Amateur class and third overall to Dave Ostlund and Jason Bergmann. He also competed that year at Utah's Strongest Man taking third to Travis Ortmeyer (1st) and Kevin Nee (2nd.)

In 2006, Matt competed in the World's Strongman Challenge taking 6th behind such Strongman as Zydrunas Savickas and Derek Poundstone.

In 2007, Matt competed at the Fresno Pro Qualifier to qualify for Nationals. He competed at America's Strongest Man in Charlotte, NC and placed 7th. Matt also competed at IFSA Worlds in Geumsan, South Korea. While in South Korea, Matt met the (now) Strongman Champions League promoters Ilkka Kinnunen and Marcel Mostert.

Matt competed in the Ukraine and Team USA v. Team Union in Belarus in 2008.

Matt's Strongman career took off in 2009 at an American Strongman Live show in Anderson, S.C. He also competed in American Strongman Live in Tulsa, O.K. and competed in his first Strongman Champions League competition in Finland in May. He has gone on to compete with Champions League in such locations as Holland; Slovakia; Serbia; South Africa; and Gibraltar.

Matt currently trains at his home gym and sometimes trains events with others at Winner's Edge Sports Performance.

Matt's biggest influence in Strongman has come from Bill Kazmaier for his awesomeness (and his beard); Zydrunas Savickas for his calm confidence in competition; and Karl Gillingham for his never ending energy and desire to do his best.

Matt's recent accomplishment is his 5th-place finish at the World Loglift Championships in Vilnius, Lithuania.

Personal
Matt grew up in Wauwatosa, Wisconsin, a suburb of Milwaukee. The eldest of six children, he is thankful for the support of sisters Kari (Wanat-Sperry), Becky (Oiler), brother T.J., sisters Kitty (Berkovitz), and Alli. His parents, Tom (Iowa alumn and former offensive tackle for the Hawkeyes) and Jean (also Iowa alumn) have also been a constant positive influence in Matt's life. Matt will always have a special place in his heart for his step-daughters Tori, Callie, and Chelsie. He now resides in 'Tosa with his wife (Juli Peterson) and her son, Oscar along with their two Kuvasz, Preacher and Dazzle.

References

American strength athletes
American sportsmen
1975 births
Living people
People from Wauwatosa, Wisconsin